The John Muir Trust (JMT) is a Scottish charity, established in 1983 to conserve wild land and wild places for the benefit of all. The Trust runs an environmental award scheme, manages several estates, mainly in the Highlands and Islands of Scotland and campaigns for better protection of wild land. In 2017, it took on a lease to manage Glenridding Common in the English Lake District.

Activities
The John Muir Trust was founded in 1983 by Denis Mollison, Nicholas Luard, Nigel Hawkins and Chris Brasher. The organisation was inspired by the work of Scottish-born conservationist John Muir – a key figure in the modern conservation movement, particularly in the USA where he worked to save Yosemite National Park and other areas of wilderness. Building on Muir's reputation there, the Trust has links with the Sierra Club, which John Muir founded in California in 1892.

The Trust is a membership organization with more than 11,000 members (December 2017). It works to raise awareness of the benefits of wild land and campaigns for better protection of wild land, challenging inappropriate developments when these threaten an area. In 2014, the Scottish Government adopted the Wild Land Areas map into planning policy.

In February 1997, Environment Minister Lord Lindsay launched a new environmental award scheme, the John Muir Award, which has grown steadily over 21 years.

John Muir's birthplace
In 1998, together with East Lothian Council, Dunbar's John Muir Association and Dunbar Community Council, the Trust formed a new organisation called the John Muir Birthplace Trust. The following year JMBT purchased John Muir's Birthplace at 126 High Street, Dunbar. They have turned it into a centre which tells the story of John Muir's early years in Dunbar where he established his passion for wild places and creatures.

In 2013, the Trust opened the Wild Space visitor centre below its existing offices in the centre of Pitlochry.

Land management

The John Muir Trust owns and manages some of the finest wild land in the highlands and islands of Scotland. As well as protecting landscapes, the Trust works to restore natural habitats and encourage native species. It works with local people and communities, and seeks to increase awareness and understanding of wild places.

In Perthshire, the Trust restored and realigned the main footpath to the summit of Schiehallion. The Trust has carried out major restoration work on the Steall Gorge footpath in Glen Nevis, Sandwood Bay in Sutherland, Blà Bheinn and Druim Hain on Skye and Suilven in Assynt. In a number of locations it works to protect and restore ancient woodland and native woodlands.

List of properties
The south side and summit of Ben Nevis, the highest mountain in the British Isles
Glenlude near Traquair in the Scottish Borders
Li & Coire Dhorrcail on the north coast of the Knoydart peninsula
Quinag, the three peak mountain in Assynt
Sandwood Bay in north west Sutherland
East Schiehallion in Highland Perthshire, which includes the summit and the main footpath
Strathaird, Torrin and Sconser, Skye which include the Red Cuillin and part of the Black Cuillin

Working in partnership
As owner of the Ben Nevis Estate, JMT plays a key role in the Nevis Partnership, which covers care of the Ben itself and the wider Nevis area including Glen Nevis and the Allt a' Mhuilinn leading to the North Face. The Trust helped establish the Knoydart Foundation, which purchased the  Knoydart Estate in 1999. The purchase brought the "rough bounds" into community and conservation ownership. The Trust is the only external representative on the North Harris Trust, which aims to manage, develop and conserve the North Harris Estate (Outer Hebrides) in a sustainable manner. In 2005, JMT purchased the Quinag Estate in Sutherland and joined the Assynt Foundation (Lochinver) to assist them in purchasing and managing the neighbouring Glencanisp and Drumrunie Estates.

The Trust has given support to the Carrifran Wildwood project, initiated by the Borders Forest Trust. The Wildwood group purchased land in the Carrifran valley in the Moffat Hills of Southern Scotland in 1999 and has started to recreate a large tract of woodland wilderness that will be used as an educational resource.

At the end of 2017, JMT signed a three-year lease to manage Glenridding Common in the Lake District, which includes most of Helvellyn (England's third highest peak), Striding Edge and Red Tarn.

John Muir Award
The John Muir Trust established an environmental award scheme in 1997.  The John Muir Award encourages people of all backgrounds to enjoy and care for wild places. The award is free, inclusive, non-competitive and flexible. The Trust works with hundreds of partners on the ground throughout the UK to deliver the Award on the ground, including schools, outdoor groups, environmental organisations, and rehabilitation charities. In Scotland it is part of the Curriculum for Excellence and is delivered in all 32 local authority areas.

The John Muir Lifetime Achievement Award is occasionally bestowed on individuals who have demonstrated outstanding work relating to the protection and enjoyment of wild land. Recipients have been:
2000 Tom Weir, mountaineer and broadcaster
2004 Adam Watson, ecologist, mountaineer and author 
2006 Doug Scott, mountaineer
2008 Irvine Butterfield, writer, photographer and mountain enthusiast
2018 Larry Downing, American environmental campaigner

See also
Glamaig, Isle of Skye
Ladhar Bheinn, Knoydart
John Muir Way

References

External links
John Muir Trust
John Muir Award

Charities based in Scotland
Nature conservation in Scotland
Sierra Club
Scottish coast and countryside
Organizations established in 1983
1983 establishments in Scotland
Native plant societies
Organisations based in Perth and Kinross
Trust